Mandawara is a village under Kuchaman City tehsil in Nagaur district in the Indian state of Rajasthan.

Geography
It has an average elevation of 369 metres (1,210 feet).

Demographics
 Indian census, Mandawara had a population of 2,876. Males constitute 53% of the population and females 47%. Mandawara has an average literacy rate of 65%, higher than the national average of 59.5%: male literacy is 73%, and female literacy is 56%. In Mandawara, 16% of the population is under 6 years of age.

Schools 
A number of schools are located in Mandawara:

 Global College
 Noble ITI College
 Marwar College
 Motherland public School
 Government Secondary School

Connectivity
Mandawara is well connected with Nh 8 highway

References

Cities and towns in Nagaur district